The Massacres of the Triumvirate is a 1566 oil on canvas painting by Antoine Caron, now in the Louvre Museum.

The only signed and dated work by Caron, it shows the Colosseum and other Roman monuments in the background and refers to the massacre of 300 opponents initiated by the Second Triumvirate in 43 BC and by extension to the massacres of Protestants in Caron's own time.

Bibliography
 Marion Delecroix and Loreline Dourneau, Le temps d’une décapitation : Imaginaire d’un instant imperceptible. Peinture Littérature, Presses universitaires de Provence, 2020, p. 22 sq..
 Frédéric Hueber, Antoine Caron, peintre de ville, peintre de cour (1521-1599), Presses universitaires de Rennes, Presses universitaires François Rabelais, 2018, p. 99-106.
 Nathalie Barrandon, « Les massacres de la République romaine : De l’exemplum à l’objet d’histoire (xvie – xxie siècles) », Anabases, no 28, 2018
 Suzanne Ferrieres-Pestureau, La violence à l'œuvre, Éditions du Cerf, 2018 (ISBN 9782204123334), p. 67 sq..
Neil Cox and Mark Greengrass, « Painting Power: Antoine Caron’s Massacres of the Triumvirate », in Ritual and violence, Natalie Zemon Davis and early modern France, Past and Present, 2012 (DOI 10.1093/pastj/gtr025), p. 241-274.
 Valérie Auclair, « L’œil médusé. Perspective et interprétations des massacres du Triumvirat d’Antoine Caron (1566) », Communications, no 85, 2009, p. 79-10 (lire en ligne [archive]).
 Jean Ehrmann, Antoine Caron, peintre des fêtes et des massacres, Flammarion, 1986.
 Isabelle Compin et Anne Roquebert, Catalogue sommaire illustré des peintures du musée du Louvre et du musée d'Orsay, t. III. Ecole française, A-K, R.M.N., 1986, p. 98.
 Isabelle Compin and Nicole Reynaud, Catalogue des peintures du musée du Louvre, t. I, Ecole française, R.M.N., 1972, p. 52.
 Sylvie Béguin (ed.), L'École de Fontainebleau, Éditions des Musées Nationaux, 1972.
 Gustave Lebel, « La peinture française au XVIe siècle. Nouvelles précisions sur Antoine Caron », L'Amour de l'Art, 1938, p. 271-280
 Anatole de Montaiglon, « Antoine Caron de Beauvais, peintre du xvie siècle », L'Artiste, February 1850.

1560s paintings
Paintings in the Louvre by French artists